The fourth season of CSI: Miami premiered on CBS on September 19, 2005 and ended May 22, 2006. The series stars David Caruso and Emily Procter.

Description 
With a mole in their midst, Horatio and Calleigh head a team of elite Crime Scene Investigators as they enter their most challenging season yet. Under the roof of a state-of-the-art redesigned crime lab, the dynamic duo investigate a series of crimes including a night-club murder, the death of a pool boy, a cold case rape, and a murder with a double-jeopardy clause, all whilst under the scrutiny of an anonymous mole, and facing a series of cases that threaten the team. With Alexx accused of murdering a child molester, Horatio accused of murdering an innocent woman, Wolfe facing the loss of his eye, and Mac Taylor joining the team when a prisoner transfer goes awry, it's ultimately Delko who faces the greatest loss: his sister who was to marry Horatio is gunned down by the Mala Noche gang in an attack that will begin a narrative recurring throughout the next several seasons.

Cast

Main cast 
 David Caruso as Horatio Caine; a CSI Lieutenant and the Director of the MDPD Crime Lab.
 Emily Procter as Calleigh Duquesne; a veteran CSI Detective, the CSI Assistant Supervisor and a ballistics expert.
 Adam Rodriguez as Eric Delko; a CSI Detective and Wolfe's partner.
 Khandi Alexander as Alexx Woods; a Medical Examiner assigned to CSI.
 Jonathan Togo as Ryan Wolfe; a newly hired CSI Detective and Delko's partner.

Recurring 
 Rex Linn as Frank Tripp; a senior Robbery-Homicide Division (RHD) Detective assigned to assist the CSIs.
 Eva LaRue as Natalia Boa Vista; an undercover FBI Agent assigned to the team.
 Alana de la Garza as Marisol Delko-Caine; Horatio's wife and Delko's sister.
 Bellamy Young as Monica West; an Assistant States Attorney.
 Robert LaSardo as Memmo Fierro; a member of the Mala Noche.
David Lee Smith as Rick Stetler; an IAB officer.

Guest stars 
 Gary Sinise as Mac Taylor; the Director of the New York Crime Lab and an NYPD Detective.

Episodes

References

External links
 DVD Release Dates at TVShowsOnDVD.com.

04
2005 American television seasons
2006 American television seasons